Spain participated in the Junior Eurovision Song Contest 2019 which took place on 24 November 2019 in Gliwice, Poland. The Spanish broadcaster Televisión Española (TVE) organised an internal selection to select the Spanish entry.

Background

Prior to the 2019 Contest, Spain had participated in the Junior Eurovision Song Contest in four consecutive years since its debut in the inaugural  Contest, having won the contest on their second appearance with the song "Antes muerta que sencilla", performed by María Isabel.

On 25 June 2019, TVE announced that they would return to the contest in 2019, after a 13-year absence.

Entry selection

Melani García was announced as the Spanish entrant on 24 July 2019 during the talk show A partir de hoy, hosted by Máximo Huerta and aired on La 1. Her entry's title, "Marte", and a preview of the song were released to the public on 20 September 2019. The song was written and produced by Pablo Mora alongside Manu Chalud, with the collaboration of Melani García and it was released in full on 4 October 2019.

At Junior Eurovision
During the opening ceremony and the running order draw which both took place on 18 November 2019, Spain was drawn to perform fifth on 24 November 2019, following North Macedonia and preceding Georgia. Melani was accompanied on stage by Edurne Rodriguez, Yara Díez, Violeta Leal and María Mihali.

Voting

Detailed voting results
The following members comprised the Spanish jury:
 María Isabelwinner of the Junior Eurovision Song Contest 2004
 Pablo Pinilla (jury chairperson)composer, songwriter, producer
 Natalia Rodríguezsinger, composer, television host
 GinebraKid from Community of Madrid Orchestra
 JorgeKid from Community of Madrid Orchestra

References

Junior
Spain
Junior Eurovision Song Contest